Excuses for Bad Behavior is a two-part album series by Sandra Bernhard. The first album was released in 1994 while the second was released in 2004.

Part one

Excuses for Bad Behavior (Part One) is a combination of spoken comedy bits, comedic songs, and pop/rock music.

Co-written and co-produced by Bernhard's longtime collaborator Mitch Kaplan, the album features Bernhard singing originals and standards. Disco classic "You Make Me Feel (Mighty Real)" begins with a vocal solo and is then translated to a modern dance song. "Manic Superstar" combines the song "Everything's Alright" from the musical Jesus Christ Superstar and the song "Manic Depression" by Jimi Hendrix. "Sympathy For the Devil" by the Rolling Stones is also covered.

Comedic bits include the spoken word "The Letter", in which Bernhard reads a fictional letter from a lesbian fan who has "heard" the album in question ("Jesus Christ, why is she singing?"). "Christmas" is a story of holidays past told by a Jewish woman who never actually experienced them. Other songs have a comedic edge, such as "Prophecies", a spoof on 1-900 psychic hotlines.

The album was released on a smaller independent label and did moderately well, but is currently unavailable for mainstream purchase. Plans for a special two-disc re-release (made exclusively available on Bernhard's website) have been posted there for over a year, but no product has been offered yet.

Reception

Track listing
"Excuses For Bad Behavior"
"You Make Me Feel (Mighty Real)"
"Manic Superstar"
"(I'm Waiting)"
"Who Knew?!"
"Innocence"
"The Letter"
"Lonely Town"
"Christmas"
"Prophecies"
"Sympathy For The Devil"
"Manhattan"
"Phone Sex (Do You Want Me Tonight?)"
"(I'm Waiting)"
"50 Ways To Leave Your Lover"
"La Lupe"
"The Woman I Could've Been"
"The Way You Make Me Feel"

Part two

Excuses for Bad Behavior (Part Two), like Part One, is a combination of spoken comedy bits, comedic songs, and pop/country/rock music. Unlike Part One, the album was not released by a major label. It was sold on burned CD-Rs by Bernhard at her live shows and via her website.

Bernhard announced in 1995 that she had no interest in making a (Part 2), despite the title of (Part 1) , and that rather the title was simply a "tongue-in-cheek twist on" the Guns N' Roses albums Use Your Illusion I & II. 

The album deals heavily with politics, including discussions about 9/11. In "The Dixie Chicks", Bernhard sings:
"The Dixie Chicks were wrong, then right. I can't comprehend what is true. You tell me something, then take it back. Why the hell do you support Iraq?" The political controversy that surrounded The Dixie Chicks is discussed. A small tour was launched to accompany the release. They would later become friends; Natalie Maines of The Dixie Chicks appeared at several of Bernhard's performances of her later show Everything Bad & Beautiful, and the group and Bernhard appeared in a Christmas commercial for Old Navy.

Track listing
 Here I Go Again
 Crazy Day In The Valley
 Surreal With Love
 High Alert At 20th Century Fox
 Invitations
 Recent Tragic Events
 Condoleezza Rice
 The Dixie Chicks
 30th High School Reunion
 Arizona
 Can't You See
 Cicely Bernhard: Platinum Member
 Canadian Mishigas
 Dylan's Candy Bar
 Making Out With Britney
 Every Comes & Goes
 Jane Seymour
 What's Up With Comme?
 What's Going On
 Little Red Corvette

References

1994 albums
2004 albums
Album series
Sandra Bernhard albums
Pop albums by American artists
1990s comedy albums
2000s comedy albums